The Dig may refer to:

The Dig (band), American rock band
The Dig (2018 film), a 2018 film
The Dig (2021 film), a 2021 film
"The Dig" (House), a 2011 episode of House
The Dig (novel), a 2007 novel by John Preston
The Dig (video game), a 1995 video game by LucasArts

See also

Dig (disambiguation)